Joseph William Jennings (June 28, 1916 – November 29, 1999) was a Canadian professional ice hockey player who played 108 games in the National Hockey League between 1941 and 1945. He played for the Detroit Red Wings and Boston Bruins. He was born in Toronto, Ontario.

Career statistics

Regular season and playoffs

External links

1916 births
1999 deaths
Boston Bruins players
Canadian expatriate ice hockey players in England
Canadian ice hockey right wingers
Detroit Red Wings players
Earls Court Rangers players
Hershey Bears players
Indianapolis Capitals players
St. Louis Flyers players
Ice hockey people from Toronto